Crest Capital is an equipment financing and leasing company, based in Atlanta, Georgia. It was reviewed by Business News Daily and Business.com as best equipment financier of 2020, and by Investopedia as best overall equipment financing company of 2021.

Background
Crest Capital was founded in 1989, and it is based in Atlanta, Georgia. Its president is Mark French, Charlie Hanavich is the CART Director and Chris Fletcher is the Senior Vice President of National Accounts.

Business and services
Crest Capital provides financing to businesses for purchase or lease of new or used equipment. It provides equipment, vehicle, furniture, and software lease and loan agreements to small and medium-sized businesses. Crest Capital also offers leasing and financing for agricultural, automotive diagnostic, food service, forestry, health, industrial, manufacturing, medical, office, packaging, printing, retail, software, technology and other general types of equipment.

Crest Capital assists businesses to benefit from Section 179 depreciation deductions to write off acquisitions of equipment and software. Crest Capital Section 179 Calculator is recommended by some dealers and advisors. As of 2011, businesses were able to claim up to $500,000. This deduction also applies to the acquisition of software, computers, cars and other equipment used in the business.

Through Crest Capital Equipment Finance, Crest Capital partners with equipment dealers to make purchase and lease financing opportunities available to their customers.

Recognitions
 Best Overall Equipment Financing Company of 2021 (Investopedia)
 Best Equipment Financier of 2020 (Business News Daily and Business.com)

References

External links
 

Companies based in Atlanta
Financial services companies established in 1989
Financial services companies of the United States
Leasing companies
Privately held companies based in Georgia (U.S. state)
1989 establishments in the United States
1989 establishments in Georgia (U.S. state)
Companies established in 1989